WBTL-LP was a low-power commercial television station in Toledo, Ohio, United States, broadcasting locally on channel 34. Founded September 18, 1990, the station was owned by Venture Technologies Group, LLC. The station was formerly an affiliate of The Box, broadcasting locally on channel 5.

It was also an affiliate of America's Store until the network's shutdown on April 3, 2007. Subsequently, WBTL aired paid programming.

WBTL-LP had an application to increase power to 150 kW to better serve Toledo's suburbs as well as Bedford Township, Michigan. This was later dismissed, but a new application was filed. Had it been approved, the tower would have moved to Monroe County and served Monroe and the Downriver Detroit suburbs. However, since there was no request to change the city of license from Toledo, this would have been in violation, since the proposed signal would not reach the city. This application was also dismissed.

On September 16, 2009, the Federal Communications Commission (FCC) declared the station's license forfeited, and removed the WBTL-LP call sign from their database. The FCC took this action due to the station having been silent for a period of greater than twelve months.

External links 

Television stations in Ohio
Television channels and stations established in 1990
Defunct television stations in the United States
Television channels and stations disestablished in 2009
1990 establishments in Ohio
2009 disestablishments in Ohio
BTL-LP